Michael Bullen (born 20 May 1937) is a British equestrian. He competed at the 1960 Summer Olympics and the 1964 Summer Olympics.

References

1937 births
Living people
British male equestrians
Olympic equestrians of Great Britain
Equestrians at the 1960 Summer Olympics
Equestrians at the 1964 Summer Olympics
Sportspeople from Devon